Bethpage Federal Credit Union Stadium is a 6,000-seat multi-purpose stadium in Brookville, New York. It is the home of the LIU Sharks football, lacrosse, and field hockey programs.

The stadium opened in 1966, and was renovated in 2014, when it gained sponsorship from Bethpage Federal Credit Union.

References

Sports venues in New York (state)
Multi-purpose stadiums in the United States
Long Island University
2014 establishments in New York (state)
Sports venues completed in 2014